Keshaji Chauhan was born on June 1, 1962, in Mojaru Juna, Bansakantha. His occupation is agriculture, and he participates in social activities.

Keshaji Chauhan is a member of the Bharatiya Janata Party, and was a runner-up for the Deodar constituency in 2017.

He is the President of the Deodar-based Sant Sadaram Kelavani Trust. In charge of Samast Thakor Samaj Samuh Lagna Samiti, Deodar - Bhabhar. He was the Vice President of the Banaskantha District Bharatiya Janata Party.

References

Living people
1962 births
Gujarat MLAs 2012–2017
Bharatiya Janata Party politicians from Gujarat
Gujarat MLAs 2022–2027